Karinõmme Nature Reserve is a nature reserve which is located in Pärnu County, Estonia.

The area of the nature reserve is 389 ha.

The protected area was founded in 2006 to protect valuable habitat types and threatened species in Karinõmme and Tarva village (both in former Koonga Parish).

References

Nature reserves in Estonia
Geography of Pärnu County